Admiral is the rank, or part of the name of the ranks, of the highest naval officers.

Admiral may also refer to:

Companies
 Admiral (electrical appliances), a brand of electrical appliances
 Admiral Overseas Corporation (AOC), a former subsidiary
 Admiral (gambling), a British high street gambling chain
 Admiral Administration, a hedge fund administrator
 Admiral Cruises, a former subsidiary of Royal Caribbean
 Admiral Group, a motor insurance company based in Cardiff, Wales
 Admiral Insurance, part of the Admiral Group
 Admiral Sportswear, a British sportswear brand

Films
 Admiral (2008 film), a 2008 Russian historical film about Alexander Kolchak
 The Admiral: Roaring Currents, a 2014 South Korean film
 Isoroku (film), also known as The Admiral and Admiral Yamamoto, a 2011 Japanese film
 Michiel de Ruyter (film), a 2015 Dutch film released internationally under the title Admiral

People

Given name or nickname
 Admiral Bailey, Jamaican dancehall deejay
 Admiral Dewey Larry (born 1958), American football player
 Admiral Muskwe (born 1998), Zimbabwean footballer
 Admiral Schofield (born 1997), American basketball player
 Jack Nimitz (1930–2009), American jazz saxophonist nicknamed "The Admiral"
 David Robinson (born 1965), American basketball player nicknamed "The Admiral"

Surname
 Jan l'Admiral (1699–1773), Dutch engraver
 Kevin Admiral, United States Army brigadier general
 Virginia Admiral (1915–2000), American painter and poet, mother of actor Robert De Niro

Places
 Admiral, Saskatchewan, a hamlet in Canada
 Admiral, West Virginia, U.S.
 North Admiral, Seattle, sometimes simply called Admiral or the Admiral district, a neighborhood in Seattle, Washington, U.S.

Ships
 , a class of Royal Navy ships, six of which were built
 , a class of Royal Navy ships, of which only HMS Hood was completed
 , three ships of the U.S. Navy
 Admiral (steamship), a museum ship in Estonia
 , an American excursion steamboat
 , a British steamer that was operated by the German East Africa Line

Sports
 Admiral Vladivostok, a Russian ice hockey team
 Admiral F.C., a Kenyan association football team
 Admiral's Cup, an international yachting regatta
 Amsterdam Admirals, a defunct American football team from Amsterdam
 Milwaukee Admirals, an American Hockey League franchise 
 Mobile Admirals, a professional American football team in 1999
 Norfolk Admirals (AHL), an American Hockey League franchise
 Norfolk Admirals (ECHL), an East Coast Hockey League team

Other uses
 Admiral (train), a named passenger service of the Pennsylvania Railroad
 Opel Admiral, a German luxury car
 Admiral (butterfly) or Limenitis, a genus of butterflies
 Admiral (grape), another name for the German/Italian wine grape Trollinger
 Admiral (novel), a 2016 military science fiction novel by Sean Danker
 Admirals (philately), a series of definitive stamps issued in the British Commonwealth
 Admiral Apartments, a 1909 apartment building in Portland, Oregon, United States
 Admiral Theater, a landmark film theater in West Seattle, Washington
 Admiral Theatre, an adult venue in Chicago, Illinois

See also
 Admiralty (disambiguation)